Graydon Nicholas  (born 1946) is a Canadian attorney, judge, and politician who served as the appointed 30th Lieutenant Governor of New Brunswick (2009-2014). He is the first Indigenous  person to hold the office, the first to be appointed as a provincial court judge (in 1991), and the first in Atlantic Canada to obtain a law degree.

Early life and education
Graydon Nicholas was born into a Maliseet family on the Tobique First Nations Reserve. He earned a Bachelor of Science degree from St. Francis Xavier University and, in 1971, a Bachelor of Law degree from the University of New Brunswick. He was the first First Nations person in Atlantic Canada to earn a law degree. He also obtained a Master of Social Work degree from Wilfrid Laurier University in 1974.

Career
Returning to New Brunswick, Nicholas worked for the Union of New Brunswick Indians, serving as its chairman of the board (1976–1980) and president (1980–1988). Selected as chair of the Native Studies program at St. Thomas University, he has lectured part time.

Nicholas was appointed as a provincial court judge in 1991, but not the first aboriginal to be selected for the position in Atlantic Canada (see, James Igloliorte, Happy Valley-Goose Bay, NL, 1980-81). He has worked for justice for First Nations and other peoples, particularly in the area of logging rights. During this period, he also lectured in theology at the Vancouver School of Theology and the Native Ministries Consortium program.

In September 2009, Nicholas was appointed as the next Lieutenant Governor of New Brunswick on the advice of Prime Minister Stephen Harper, on the suggestion of Premier Shawn Graham with support from the opposition.  He was the first Aboriginal named to this position. He served a five-year term. He succeeded Herménégilde Chiasson, the poet and philosopher, on September 30, 2009.

Honours
New Brunswick Human Rights Award
Fredericton YMCA Peace Medallion
Canada 125 Medal
Inaugural recipient of the Golden Jubilee Medal
2011, Nicholas was honoured as one of Wilfrid Laurier University's 100 alumni of achievement
Member of the Order of New Brunswick and of the Order of Canada

See also
 The Canadian Crown and Aboriginal peoples

References

External links
Official website of the Lieutenant-Governor of New Brunswick 
Backgrounder: The Honourable Graydon Nicholas. Office of the Prime Minister. September 10, 2009.

1946 births
Living people
Maliseet people
Lieutenant Governors of New Brunswick
Members of the Order of New Brunswick
Judges in New Brunswick
Members of the Order of Canada
21st-century Canadian politicians